Amaliya Alish gizi Panahova (15 June 1945 – 8 November 2018) was an Azerbaijani film and stage actress. She was a People's Artist of the Republic of Azerbaijan.

She died of cancer in Baku on 8 November 2018, at the age of 73.

Selected filmography
 The Day Passed (film, 1971)
 Babek (film, 1979)

References

External links 

1945 births
2018 deaths
Actors from Ganja, Azerbaijan
20th-century Azerbaijani actresses
21st-century Azerbaijani actresses
Azerbaijani film actresses
Azerbaijani stage actresses
Soviet film actresses
Soviet stage actresses
Deaths from cancer in Azerbaijan
People's Artists of Azerbaijan